Suzanne Nance is an American singer (soprano), actress, and radio and television personality.

She was a faculty member of the Cappelli Institute of Music in Chicago (professor of voice), and simultaneously, a host and a producer at Aspen Public Radio in Aspen, Colorado. In September 2007, she became the music director of the Maine Public Broadcasting Network. She also hosted its Morning Classical Music radio program. A soprano, she also continues to actively perform.

Nance is currently President and CEO of allclassical.org (KQAC 89.9 FM), Portland, Oregon. She was formerly the station's afternoon host from 2:00PM to 6:00PM weekdays, and served for a time as Interim CEO.

She continues to participate in the KQAC Sunday Brunch program and serves as Executive Producer for all of the station's nationally-syndicated programs.

References

External links
 
 

Living people
American women singers
Year of birth missing (living people)
21st-century American women